is a Japanese professional footballer who currently plays as a midfielder for Hong Kong Premier League club Rangers.

Club career
On 6 January 2023, Rangers announced the signing of Kanda.

Career statistics

Club
Updated to 23 February 2018.

References

External links
Profile at Ehime FC
Profile at Consadole Sapporo

SC Sagamihara Transfer

1994 births
Living people
Association football people from Hokkaido
Sportspeople from Sapporo
Japanese footballers
Japanese expatriate footballers
Japan youth international footballers
J2 League players
J3 League players
Hong Kong Premier League players
Hokkaido Consadole Sapporo players
SC Sagamihara players
Ehime FC players
Tokyo 23 FC players
YSCC Yokohama players
Hong Kong Rangers FC players
Association football midfielders
Expatriate footballers in Hong Kong
Japanese expatriates in Hong Kong
Japanese expatriate sportspeople in Hong Kong